St. Maria im Kapitol (St. Mary's in the Capitol) is an 11th-century Romanesque church located in the Kapitol-Viertel in the old town of Cologne, Germany. The name “im Kapitol“ refers to the Roman temple for the Capitoline Triad that was built on today’s site of the church in the first century. The Catholic church is based on the Church of the Nativity in Bethlehem, was dedicated to St. Mary and built between 1040 and 1065. It is one of twelve Romanesque churches built in Cologne during this period.

Measuring  100 m x 40 m and encompassing 4,000 square metres of internal space, St. Maria is the largest  of the Romanesque churches in Cologne. Like many of the latter, it has  an east end which is trefoil in shape, with three apses. It has a nave and aisles and three towers to the west. It is considered the most important work of German church architecture of the Salian dynasty.

History

Late antiquity 
A temple to the Capitoline triad stood upon the small hill in the southernmost part of the first century Colonia Claudia Ara Agrippinensium that should later become the site of St. Maria im Kapitol. The temple was built to commemorate Claudia Ara Agrippinensium being granted the title of colonia. The temple itself measured 33 m x 29.5 m and was surrounded by a 97 m x 69 m courtyard. Inside of the temple, three cellae – one for each of the worshipped gods – were built. The temple’s walls were later used as a foundation for the church.

Early middle ages 
After the Franks conquered Cologne in the fifth century, the Frankish mayors of the palace resided around the Capitoline hill. Pepin of Herstal, who effectively ruled the empire after becoming mayor of all three Frankish kingdoms in 687, lived in Cologne for a period of time. His wife Plectrude had a proprietary church built on the ruins of the capitol before her death. She was buried in this aisleless church.

High middle ages 
In the middle of the eleventh century, the archbishop of Cologne Hermann II. and his sister Ida, abbess of St. Maria im Kapitol, initiated construction of a new church. The altar and the nave were consecrated by pope Leo IX.

20th century 
In World War II, the church was damaged heavily. Until 1956, the church could only be used in the closed off western part. In 1984, the eastern part was reopened and could also be used.

Works of art 
The church's works of art include:
 the wooden doors (from c. 1065)
 two ledgers of Plectrudis' sarcophagus (c. 1160 and 1280)
 Hermann-Josef-Virgin with the apple (c. 1180)
 Hardenrath chapel with choristers' tribune (second half of the 15th century)
 Virgin on a Throne (likely 1200)
 Plague crucifix (c. 1300)

See also 
 Twelve Romanesque churches of Cologne
 Cologne Cathedral 
 German architecture
 Romanesque architecture
 List of regional characteristics of Romanesque churches 
 Romanesque secular and domestic architecture
 History of medieval Arabic and Western European domes

References

External links 
 

 official site 
 

Innenstadt, Cologne
Roman Catholic churches in Cologne
Basilica churches in Germany
Romanesque architecture in Germany
7th-century churches in Germany
Ottonian architecture